Shiomi may refer to:

Shiomi (surname), a Japanese surname
Shiomi, Tokyo, a district in Kōtō, Tokyo, Japan
Mount Shiomi, a mountain of the Akaishi Mountains, Japan
Shiomi Station (disambiguation), multiple railway stations in Japan
Outrage Girl Shiomi, a manga series written and illustrated by Kazurou Inoue